Alexei Andreevich  Bondarev (born January 9, 1983) is a Russian professional ice hockey defenceman who is currently an unrestricted free agent. He most recently played under contract with Avangard Omsk in the Kontinental Hockey League (KHL). He previously played with HC Spartak Moscow for a second stint after previously appearing with HC CSKA Moscow from Traktor Chelyabinsk and formerly Metallurg Magnitogorsk He signed a one-year contract with CSKA on May 14, 2014.

References

External links 

1983 births
Living people
Avangard Omsk players
HC CSKA Moscow players
Kazakhstani ice hockey defencemen
Metallurg Magnitogorsk players
HC Neftekhimik Nizhnekamsk players
Sportspeople from Oskemen
HC Spartak Moscow players
Traktor Chelyabinsk players
Zauralie Kurgan players